Oleg Ratiy or Oleh Ratiy (born 5 July 1970 Kharkiv, Ukrainian SSR) is a former Soviet and Ukrainian footballer and Ukrainian football coach.

References

External links
 
 
 Personal website

1970 births
Living people
Footballers from Kharkiv
Soviet footballers
Ukrainian footballers
FC Olympik Kharkiv players
FC Ahrotekhservis Sumy players
FC Kremin Kremenchuk players
FC Vorskla Poltava players
FC Hirnyk-Sport Horishni Plavni players
FC Metalurh Zaporizhzhia players
FC Metalurh-2 Zaporizhzhia players
SSSOR Metalurh Zaporizhzhia players
FC Oleksandriya players
FC Nyva Vinnytsia players
MFC Mykolaiv players
FC Volyn Lutsk players
FC Desna Chernihiv players
Ukrainian football managers
FC Hirnyk-Sport Horishni Plavni managers
FC Bukovyna Chernivtsi managers
FC Metalist Kharkiv managers
Ukrainian expatriate football managers
Expatriate football managers in Slovakia
Association football defenders